Mazhabi Sikh (also known as Mazbhabi, Mazbhi, Majhabhi or Majabhi) is a community from Northern India, especially Punjab region, who follow Sikhism. The word Mazhabi is derived from the Arabic term mazhab (Mazhab means religion or sect), and can be translated as the faithful. They live mainly in Indian Punjab, Rajasthan and Haryana.

Origins
When Guru Tegh Bahadur, the ninth Sikh guru, was martyred by the Mughals in Delhi, Rangreta community member recovered his dismembered body from a Muslim crowd and brought it back to his son, Guru Gobind Singh. His name was Bhai Jaita Ji. In recognition of their act, he admitted the untouchables into the Khalsa (the Sikh faith), giving them the name Mazhabi ("faithful").

Divisions
Within the present-day Mazhabi community, one group calls itself the Ranghreta and claims a higher status on the grounds that one of their ancestors was Bhai Jaita Ranghreta, who carried the head of Tegh Bahadur from Delhi to Guru Gobind Singh in Anandpur Sahib On seeing this act of bravery and self renunciation Guru Gobind Singh uttered "Ranghreta Guru ka beta", which means Ranghreta is son of Guru.

The definition of Mazhabi today is somewhat blurred because of the influence of Valmikism. While Sikhism is in theory an egalitarian faith that takes no notice of caste, gender and other social demarcations, Fenech and Singh note that "there is often a level of hypocrisy between what is taught and what is actually put into practice." Mazhabis are discriminated against by Sikhs whose origins lie with higher-ranked castes and many Chuhras have turned to Valmikism but are still referred to as Mazhabi. While young Valmikis, who accept Valmiki as their guru, increasingly object to being labelled as Sikh, their elders are less concerned. At least one of their organisations, the Valmiki-Mazhabi Sikh Morcha, conflates the terms.

Mazhabis who converted from Sikhism to Christianity under the influence of Christian missionaries in the later years of the British Raj are sometimes referred to as Christian Mazhabi Sikhs. Some also profess Hinduism but call themselves Mazhabi, as do a small number who follow the tenets of Buddhism.

Military service

Before the British Raj era
The Mazhabis were recruited to the army of Ranjit Singh but as separate companies attached to regular battalions rather than as part of an integrated force. This situation was forced upon him because high-caste Sikhs refused any closer connection. They served as pioneers, operating mainly as a labour corps that worked on construction of roads, bridges and canals. They were not, however, mere labourers because it was expected that their infantry skills would enable them to defend themselves in the event of attack.

British Raj
The Mazhabis, whom historian Stephen Cohen says "had strong caste traditions of violence and aggressiveness and were classed as a criminal caste by the British", lost their military employment following the defeat of the Sikhs in the Anglo-Sikh Wars. Some eventually found employment as pioneers in the army of Gulab Singh, the Maharaja of Jammu and Kashmir. In 1857, the British turned to them for help during the Indian Rebellion, apparently to counteract the rebellious sepoys of the Bengal Army. The First Pioneer Sikh Regiment soon found itself helping to break the Siege of Delhi, a second regiment was raised in 1858 and a third followed soon after. This military employment contributed to a gradual improvement in their social status and in 1911 their official classification in Gujranwala and Lyallpur was uplifted to that of "agricultural caste" by the British authorities. The British military classification system, which rated recruits according to their caste, continued to assert that Mazhabis were best suited as pioneers while, for example, Jat Sikhs should be infantry.

It was calculated in 1898 that there were 2,452 Mazhabis in the army, along with 28,146 Jat Sikhs and 9,000 other Sikhs. During World War I the single-battalion regiments of the Mazhabi Sikh Pioneers – the 23rd, 32nd and 34th Pioneer Regiments – were expanded to comprise three battalions each. These units served in Egypt, Europe, Mesopotamia and Palestine and performed well. The 1/34th Sikh Pioneers were awarded the title of "Royal".

The Sikh Pioneer regiments, which were practically the only military employer of the Mazhabis, were disbanded in December 1932. The cause was mainly advances in road-building techniques and the need to economise. Most of their recruits were released from the army, the only means by which they had been able to advance themselves in society. A Mazhabi Sikh platoon did replace Rajputs as the Indian Platoon of the Welch Regiment in 1933.

The Mazhabi Sikhs, together with the Ramdasia, were recruited to the Sikh Light Infantry regiment (SLI) after its formation in 1941. Despite unwillingness among some policy makers, the British had to abandon their traditional distinction between martial and non-martial races during the Second World War. This was necessitated by the need for more recruits than could be supplied by those communities upon which they usually relied, such as the Jat Sikhs, Dogras and Punjabi Musalmans. In addition, indiscipline among Jat Sikhs caused by their concerns regarding a post-war division of India was another reason to prefer recruitment of new classes. While recruitment from the pre-war martial classes was still pre-eminent, that from newly recognised classes such as the Mazhabis and Ramdasias became significant. Mazhabis were even recruited into units such as the 13th Frontier Force Rifles, which previously would not have contemplated them.

After independence of India
When India became independent in 1947, the British Indian Army became the Indian Army. This, like its predecessor, relies on the martial race theory for much of its recruitment and thus there is a grossly disproportionate number of Sikhs within its ranks. The Mazhabi Sikhs and Ramdasias continued their service with the SLI in the new army. The SLI has served in almost all of the post-1947 conflicts involving India, including the wars with Pakistan in 1947, 1965 and 1971, the Hyderabad Police Action of 1948 and the Chinese aggression in 1962. It has also served in Sri Lanka, where the 1st, 7th, 13th and 14th Battalions have contributed towards peace-keeping.

The Mazhabi Sikh soldiers have a reputation for their loyalty and reliability. During Operation Blue Star in 1984, when the Indian Army entered the Golden Temple, Jat Sikh soldiers broke out in mutiny against their officers in the Sikh Regiment and Punjab regiments A total of 2,000 Sikh personnel took part in the mutinies. In the most sensational case 1,400 mainly Jat Sikhs deserted after killing their commanding officer and armed themselves. A significant number of those were also new recruits who were incited easily into mutiny and some were forced at gun point to take part in the mutinies. Despite that, the Indian Army officers were correct when they expressed confidence to journalists that the Mazhabi Sikhs of the Sikh Light Infantry would not mutiny.

In Punjab, Sikh militants had stepped up their attacks on law enforcement as well as civilians, including minority groups. The Punjab had now reached a state of emergency and Director General of Police, Kanwar Pal Singh Gill, responded by raising Mazhabi Sikhs as "Special Police Officers". This tactic was designed both for community protection and to dull any incentive for Mazhabis to join with the militants, although in fact Mazhabis had often been victims of attacks by those people. Their loyalty was to the government and was never questioned. Mostly unemployed people, they were provided with guns by the state and were literally given a licence to kill. Gill received heavy criticism for the brutality and ruthlessness of his tactics but the Sikh militants were neutralised. A large number of these special police officers were said to have been used during the February 1992 elections. An open season was declared on Sikh terrorists and the police were able to use whatever means deemed necessary to achieve victory. Major Sikh militant leaders were targeted, and many did not survive.

Social status

Discrimination within the Sikh community
Most of them live in separate clusters in villages. As the 19th century drew to a close, untouchables such as the Mazhabis were still denied equal access to the gurdwara (places of worship) by their fellow Sikhs and during the early years of the 20th century members of the Arya Samaj tried to capitalise on this in their attempts to reconvert those groups to Hinduism. In spite of Sikhism's egalitarian tenets, the Singh Sabha movement also viewed them as being inferior, despite initially being established in 1873 in part with the aim of eradicating untouchability.

The British Raj system of land allocation in the Punjab also worked against the Mazhabis. As land in the new canal colonies was made available for cultivation, the Raj allocated it to people on the basis of the scale of existing landholdings, which meant that dominant landholding communities such as the Jats received most of the  that became available between 1885 and 1940 while outcastes were excluded entirely.

During the numerous discussions, conferences and proposals that preceded Indian independence, the Mazhabis sought to obtain an autonomous region within partitioned Punjab which they proposed to be called "Mazbhistan". This was one of many instances reflecting the lack of coherence among adherents of Sikhism at that time.

Many Jat Sikhs continue to look down upon the Mazhabis, and they are also considered to be of lower status by the other Dalit communities, being the Ramdasia/Ravidasia.  The internal division between Jat Sikh and Mazhabi still broadly follows the economic distinction between farmer and landless labourer. It is land-ownership rather than varna's stress on occupational status that defines discrimination within the Sikh communities of the Punjab, and Ronki Ram notes that the nature of untouchability itself in Punjab differs from the rest of India because it is "related more to prejudice than pollution". Many Mazhabi are still exploited in low-status jobs, they are often forced to live in less desirable areas of villages, cannot use the gurdwaras frequented by higher-caste Sikhs and must use special cremation grounds.

Politics
The outcome of the Shiromani Gurdwara Prabandhak Committee (SGPC) elections in December 1954 favoured Punjabi Suba, a Jat Sikh-dominated movement. Akali Dal, a religio-political party founded in 1920 and dominated by Jat Sikhs, won all 111 seats that it contested and Khalsa Dal – a new party created with government support – managing to win only three of the 132 in which it put forward a candidate. The campaign saw the Arya Samaj and Jan Sangh, who were both opposed to Punjabi Suba and believed in Hindu upper caste domination , stressing a fear of Sikh domination. They encouraged Hindu Punjabis to lie by claiming Hindi to be their first language even when it was almost always in fact Punjabi. This attempt to cause a division along religious lines had the tacit support of the government and its impact echoed down the years. In 2005, 56 expelled employees of the SGPC abandoned Sikhism and alleged that they were being discriminated against because they were Mazhabis.

According to a report published in The Tribune on 16 March 1966, a spokesperson for the Federation of Mazhabi Sikhs stated that "the Sikh Scheduled Castes had been reduced to a position of mere serfs by the Sikh landlords who would literally crush the Mazhabi Sikhs if Punjabi Suba was formed." The federation offered support for Arya Samaj and Jan Sangh in opposition to the Punjabi Suba.

Although Sikh leaders recognise the contribution of the Mazhabis and Ravidasias to the community and have tried to include them in their organisations, not least because of the size of their population, both groups still feel alienated because of discrimination by higher-caste Sikhs, especially the Jats. It is because of this that they have turned to political parties such as the Bahujan Samaj Party rather than maintaining past associations with Sikh politics through the Shiromani Akali Dal (SAD) and SGPC.

Modern-day conversions
In 2014, both the SAD and the Indian National Congress (INC) voiced their opposition to Christian Mazhabi people being reconverted to the Sikh faith in a ceremony organised by the Rashtriya Swayamsevak Sangh (RSS). Parkash Singh Badal, then Chief Minister of Punjab and an SAD elder, said that such conversions are "unfortunate and against the basic tenets of Sikhism as Sikh gurus sacrificed their lives resisting conversion", while Amarinder Singh of the INC considered the move by the Hindutva-centric RSS to be "forced conversion". The RSS said that it was not sponsoring conversion to Hinduism but rather to Sikhism and that the SGPC had been lax in stemming the tide of poor Sikh families switching to Christianity. It was claimed by an RSS colleague, Ram Gopal, that 2,470 people had already been converted in the year prior to the controversy being commented upon and that the SGPC had initially supported the idea. There were also protests by Christians, who claimed that the conversions were an attempt by the RSS to drive a wedge between their religion and Sikhism where previously there had been a harmonious relationship.

Reservation
The Government of India recognises Mazhabi Sikh as a Scheduled Caste as part of their official affirmative action program.

Demographics
Between 30,000 and 40,000 Mazhabi Sikhs were reported to be congregated at Govindghar in an attempt to reach India during the Partition of India and Pakistan in 1947. This was one of many examples of the mass migrations that took place across the border in both directions as communities found themselves in the midst of violence driven by religious differences.

, there were 2,633,921 Mazhabis in the Indian state of Punjab, of whom 2,562,761 declared themselves to be Sikh, 71,000 as Hindu and 160 as Buddhists. The total Scheduled Caste population of the state was 8,860,179. At that time, there were 158,698 Mazhabis in Rajasthan, comprising 11,582 Hindus, 147,108 Sikhs and 8 Buddhists. 141,681 lived in Haryana (11,485 Hindu, 130,162 Sikh and 34 Buddhists), 460 resided in Himachal Pradesh, 3,166 in Chandigarh, 2,829 in Delhi NCT, 6,038 in Uttarakhand, and 14,192 in Uttar Pradesh.

See also
 Criminal Tribes Act
 Sikh Pioneers & Sikh Light Infantry Association UK

References

Notes

Citations 

Dalit communities
Punjabi tribes
Sikh communities
Sikh groups and sects
Scheduled Castes of Uttar Pradesh
Scheduled Castes of Delhi
Scheduled Castes of Jammu and Kashmir
Scheduled Castes of Himachal Pradesh
Scheduled Castes of Rajasthan
Scheduled Castes of Haryana
Scheduled Castes of Punjab
Scheduled Castes of Uttarakhand